Jim Semple (1935 – 20 September 2016) was a Northern Ireland businessman and a former chairman of Crusaders F.C. He also previously played for the club. He is also a former President of the Irish Football League. 

Semple died at the age of 81 on 20 September 2016.

References

1930s births
2016 deaths
Businesspeople from Northern Ireland
Crusaders F.C. players
Association footballers from Northern Ireland
Association footballers not categorized by position